The Morehead City Marlins are a collegiate summer baseball team playing in the Coastal Plain League (CPL).  The team is based in Morehead City, North Carolina and plays its home games at O'Neal Field at Big Rock Stadium in Morehead City.  The team began play in the CPL in the 2010 season and competes in the league's East division.

History
The Marlins first game was on May 26, 2010 at the Outer Banks Daredevils, a game the Marlins won 4-3. In Morehead City's inaugural season, the Marlins won the South Division and clinched a berth in the Pettit Cup Playoffs. In the 2010 Pettit Cup Playoffs, the Marlins were eliminated by the Edenton Steamers. Prior to 2016, 2010 was the only winning season in the brief history of the Morehead City Marlins franchise. Then, in 2018 and 2019, the Marlins won back-to-back Petitt Cup Championships under head coach Jesse Lancaster. The 2020 season was canceled due to the COVID-19 pandemic. The Marlins returned to Coastal Plain League play in 2021 in the East Division. They made the 2021 Petit Cup Championship but lost the series to Savannah.

Yearly records

Coaching staff
The Marlins are coached by first year head coach Jesse Lancaster who comes to the Marlins after coaching as an assistant at Mount Olive University and helping them to a 48-10 Record and a spot in the 2017 Division II Southeast Regional. 
Hitting coach: Wiley Jackson
Pitching coach: Stephan Jordan

Rankings
In its inaugural season, Morehead City was ranked as high as 12th in the nation. The Marlins have not been ranked since.

Location
The Morehead City Marlins play their home games at O'Neal Field at Big Rock Stadium, also home of the Morehead City Legion Post 46 baseball team. The stadium is located on Mayberry Loop Road in Morehead City, North Carolina.

The Marlins hosted the 2014 CPL All-Star Weekend at the "Rock."

Alumni
Shawn Armstrong - Cleveland Indians, Seattle Mariners, and Baltimore Orioles
Chris Taylor - Seattle Mariners and Los Angeles Dodgers

References

External links
 Official Site
 Twitter Page
 Facebook Page
 YouTube Channel

Coastal Plain League
2010 establishments in North Carolina
Baseball teams established in 2010
Amateur baseball teams in North Carolina
Carteret County, North Carolina